Good Deeds Day is an international day of volunteering. Beginning in 2007, its mission is to unite people from around the world in doing good deeds for others and the planet.

Background

This day of community service was launched in 2007 in Israel by businesswoman and philanthropist, Shari Arison, through Ruach Tova, a Nonprofit organization that connects between people who want to volunteer and organizations in need of assistance.

Speaking about the day, initiator Shari Arison said:

History

Approximately 7,000 people participated in Israel in 2007. The day became global in 2011, with participants from around the world, including in the US, Ukraine and Poland. In 2012, project organizers teamed up with MTV Global for a six-week-campaign on its online and TV platforms, exposing the message to 24 million viewers around the world. In 2014, NASDAQ invited Shari Arison to kick off Good Deeds Day in the trading day closing bell ceremony. 2017 marked the fourth year in a row of the NASDAQ and Good Deeds Day collaboration.

In 2017, the 11th annual Good Deeds Day, approximately 2,500,000 participants from 93 countries volunteered, marking it the largest and most global day yet. To celebrate, project organizers held mega events in Kenya, Portugal, Italy, Poland and more.

Good Deeds Day and Ruach Tova are part of The Ted Arison Family Foundation, the philanthropic arm of the Arison Group.

Around the world

In 2011, international companies Shikun & Binui and Bank Hapoalim were among the first international participants in Good Deeds Day outside of Israel. As of 2016, Good Deeds Day is celebrated in 75 countries worldwide, and has collaborated with major cities such as Rome, São Paulo, Kaohsiung City, and New York City to create special events. In the Good Deeds Day event at Herald Square, New York City, actor and activist Adrian Grenier supported the day by speaking at the event:

Pope Francis endorsed the day in his Sunday sermon prior to Good Deeds Day 2015 in Rome and said:

In 2016 Good Deeds Day collaborated with Brazil based volunteering center Atados on a nationwide activation. Together they reached 10,000 volunteers around the country, and 40 cities across Brazil including major cities like Rio de Janeiro, Brasília, and São Paulo.

In Latin America, major Good Deeds Day events took place in Panama, Costa Rica, Brazil, Peru, and 16 other countries in the region.

In Taiwan, Good Deeds Day collaborated with TAVE (Taiwan Association for Volunteer Effort) to create major citywide activities in Kaohsiung City, Taiwan in 2016. Taiwan's Vice President, Chen Chien-jen, and Kaohsiung's Mayor, Chen Chu, were among the government officials honoring the day in 2016. Taoyuan City also hosted citywide activities, arranged by Taoyuan City Volunteer Service Association and other partnering organizations.

One of the biggest collaborations in Europe include SPES (Associazione Promozione e Solidarietà) in Italy, who organized a major Good Deeds Day event in Rome in 2016. Good Deeds Day invited runners in the Rome Marathon to join the “Roma Fun Run” and visit the Good Deeds Day fair of non-profits at the finish line.

In Israel

Good Deeds Day (Hebrew: יום המעשים הטובים) first began in Israel in 2007 with 7,000 participants and grew to 1,500,000 in 2016. Local municipalities, companies, and nonprofit organizations all around the country participate by organizing special activities in their communities, renovating or painting buildings, building community gardens, and volunteering in many other ways for populations in need. Cities such as Tel Aviv and Jerusalem also host special Good Deeds Day events that are open to the public, such as the 2016 “Counselor’s Boulevard” that took place on Rothschild Boulevard, Tel Aviv. Professionals gave free counseling sessions to passersby. Other public events include the 2015 Good Deeds Day nonprofit Fair at Rabin Square, Tel Aviv, and Ashkelon, which included hair donation stands, dog adoption area, and a give-and-take market.

Dates

* Good Deeds Day became international in 2011.

Awards
Good Deeds Day received the George W. Romney Affiliate Excellence Award in 2016.

See also

 Civic engagement
 Community service
 Global Youth Service Day
 Join Hands Day
 Make A Difference Day
 Mandela Day
 MLK Day of Service
 Mitzvah Day
 National Philanthropy Day (USA and Canada)
 National Cleanup Day 
 National Public Lands Day (US)
 National Volunteer Week (US)
 Random Acts of Kindness Day
 September 11 National Day of Service (9/11 Day)
 World Cleanup Day
 World Kindness Day

References

External links
Official Good Deeds Day website
Shari Arison website
Ted Arison Family Foundation website
Ruach Tova website

Unofficial observances
International observances
Volunteering
March observances
April observances
May observances